The 2011–12 Navy Midshipmen men's basketball team represented the United States Naval Academy during the 2011–12 NCAA Division I men's basketball season. The Midshipmen, led by first year head coach Ed DeChellis, played their home games at Alumni Hall and were members of the Patriot League.

Roster

Source

Schedule

|-
!colspan=9 style=|Regular season

|-
!colspan=9 style=| Patriot League tournament

Source

References

Navy Midshipmen men's basketball seasons
Navy
Navy
Navy